The 1955 Summer International University Sports Week were organised by the International University Sports Federation (FISU) and held in San Sebastián, Spain, between 7 and 14 August.

Sports
  Athletics
  Basketball
  Diving
  Fencing
  Field hockey
  Football
  Swimming
  Tennis
  Volleyball
  Water polo

References

 
1955
S
S
Summer International University Sports Week
Multi-sport events in Spain
Summer International University Sports Week